"I Ain't Got Nothin' but the Blues" is a 1937 song composed by Duke Ellington, with lyrics written by Don George.

Notable recordings
Duke Ellington and His Famous Orchestra Voc.: Al Hibbler - Recorded in New York City on December 1, 1944. It was released by RCA Victor Records as catalogue number 20-1623B
Ella Fitzgerald - Ella Fitzgerald Sings the Duke Ellington Songbook (1957)
Dinah Shore - included on the album Dinah Sings Some Blues with Red (1960).
Ella Fitzgerald, Joe Pass - Fitzgerald & Pass... Again (1976) 
Sarah Vaughan - The Duke Ellington Songbook, Vol. 2 (1979)
Robben Ford - Talk to Your Daughter (1988)
Roseanna Vitro - Softly (1993)
Karrin Allyson – Daydream (1997)
E.G. Kight - Takin' It Easy (2004)

See also
List of 1930s jazz standards

References

Songs with music by Duke Ellington
Songs with lyrics by Don George
Jazz songs
1930s jazz standards
Lena Horne songs
1937 songs